668 Dora is an asteroid orbiting in the asteroid belt located roughly between the orbits of the planets Mars and Jupiter.
The name may have been inspired by the asteroid's provisional designation 1908 DO.

References

External links 
 
 

Dora asteroids
Dora
Dora
Ch-type asteroids (SMASS)
19080727